Motherland is a British television sitcom set in London, which examines the trials and traumas of middle-class motherhood. It stars Anna Maxwell Martin as Julia, Diane Morgan as Liz, Paul Ready as Kevin and Lucy Punch as Amanda, amongst a range of supporting characters. A pilot episode, written by Graham Linehan, Sharon Horgan, Helen Serafinowicz and Holly Walsh was first broadcast on BBC Two on 6 September 2016 as part of its "Sitcom Season". The BBC subsequently ordered a full series of six episodes, the first of which aired on 7 November 2017.

The second series was released in its entirety on BBC iPlayer on 7 October 2019. The third season began transmission on BBC2 on 10 May 2021 with all five episodes being released on BBC iPlayer the same day. In the United States, the show is broadcast on Sundance TV. The series won a British Academy Television Award for Best Scripted Comedy in 2022. A second Christmas special aired on 23 December 2022 on BBC One.

Synopsis
When her mother decides to stop taking care of her children, middle-class Julia Johnstone is forced to begin to pay attention to her children’s schooling and the concept of middle-class motherhood. Julia later becomes friends with other parents, working-class Liz and stay-at-home dad Kevin Brady and finds herself facing mothers with dominant personalities, including the superficially polite but acerbic leader, Amanda. The children do not feature prominently in the series, generally having non-speaking roles, and their names are only occasionally mentioned.

Cast and characters

  = Main cast 
  = Recurring cast
  = Guest cast

Production

Development
The show was originally a 2011 pilot on the American network ABC. However, comedian and writer Sharon Horgan reworked the script when the pilot wasn't picked up for a full season and collaborated with Graham Linehan on turning it into a British sitcom instead. Following its pilot on BBC, it was picked up for a full series in October 2016. In March 2023, ABC confirmed a 2nd US pilot this time known as Drop Off starring Ellie Kemper who will also serve as an executive producer alongside Karan Soni. ABC Signature and Lionsgate will produce the pilot.

Filming
The show was filmed primarily in Muswell Hill, North London, and Acton, Bedford Park and Chiswick, West London. Scenes outside the children's school are filmed at Southfield Primary School in Bedford Park.

Episodes

At the 2022 BAFTA awards it was announced that Series 3 was to be the last series of the sitcom.

Pilot (2016)

Series 1 (2017)

Series 2 (2019)

Christmas special (2020)

Series 3 (2021)

Christmas special (2022)

Reception
The first series was released to favourable reviews and holds an approval rating of 82% on Rotten Tomatoes based on 22 reviews with critics. The website's critical consensus reads "Motherland pulls no punches, creating an honest and hilarious portrayal of parenthood buoyed by brilliant performances from its seasoned cast -- though for some viewers it may hit a little too close to home". The second series later received a score of 83% based on 12 reviews, with the Christmas special following on with a score of 100% based on 8 reviews. The third series later received five out of five stars by Radio Times and was released to positive reviews. The second Christmas Special, Last Christmas, which aired on 23 December 2022, garnered positive reviews.

References

External links

2016 British television series debuts
2022 British television series endings
2010s British sitcoms
2020s British sitcoms
Adultery in television
BBC high definition shows
BBC television sitcoms
English-language television shows
Narcissism in television
Polyamory in fiction
Television series about dysfunctional families
Television series created by Sharon Horgan
Television series created by Graham Linehan
Television shows set in London
Television series by Lionsgate Television
BAFTA winners (television series)